Glencoe is an community in Campbellton, New Brunswick, Canada.

The local service district of Glencoe takes its name from the community.

As of January 1, 2023 Glencoe is now a part of the City of Campbellton.

History

In 1994 the Canadian Wildlife Federation (CWF) Reforestation Program caused 6,000 trees to be planted at a deer wintering area in Glencoe.

Notable people

See also
 List of communities in New Brunswick

References
 

Communities in Restigouche County, New Brunswick
Local service districts of Restigouche County, New Brunswick